Spanishburg is an unincorporated community in Mercer County, West Virginia, United States. Spanishburg has a post office with ZIP code 25922. Spanishburg has a population of around 200. 

The community was named after Spanish Brown, a family member of a pioneer settler.

References

Unincorporated communities in Mercer County, West Virginia
Unincorporated communities in West Virginia